The Tribal Women Artists Cooperative (TWAC) was initially founded by Bulu Imam (Convener, INTACH Hazaribagh Chapter) in 1993 out of a Tribal Art Project funded by the Australian High Commission, New Delhi. The cooperative continues to be directed by Bulu Imam, Padma Shri awardee (2019) as a social worker for promoting the ritual Khovar and Sohrai mural painting tradition, benefiting thousands of village women, and has gained international recognition through several exhibitions in major art galleries around the world.

This unique tribal art project was started with about 40 women artists which began to bring the art on walls of the mud houses to paper and paint professionally. Today, the cooperative's initiative empowers over 5,000 women enabling their art to be exhibited in over 60 international venues in Australia, Canada, America, Japan, Italy, Germany, France, Sweden, Switzerland, and England.

The tribal art created by these women artists over the decades has been displayed and preserved in the Sanskriti Museum & Art Gallery, and accessible for research and study to anyone interested in the development of tribal art and culture in Jharkhand. The first collection of tribal paintings made by the cooperative in early 1990s are a part of the Bulu Imam Collection, and which is made available exclusively through the cooperative.

Objectives 

The raison d’être for the founding of the cooperative was to highlight the Meso-chalcolithic rock art of the region connected with the tradition of Khovar and Sohrai mural painting done by the tribal communities in Jharkhand as an economic resource. It also aimed to highlight the issues of displacement and indigenous rights threatened by opencast coal mining, and destruction of forests vital to the tribals as well as tigers and elephants using them as corridors. This art project was created to bring to the tribal women of the region a sense of strength in their identity and as a means of economic support.

The profits received through exhibitions and sale of artworks are divided into three accounts:

 Welfare fund for women artists.
 Employment fund through which a third of all earnings goes directly to the artist, and
 Cooperative maintenance fund.

Major collections 
 Australian Museum, Sydney
 Art Gallery of New South Wales, Sydney
 Casula Art Centre, Casula, Sydney
 Queensland Art Gallery, Brisbane
 Powerhouse Museum, Sydney
 Flinders Museum Collection, Adelaide  
 Dietmar Rothermund Collection, Heidelberg
 Volkerkunde Museum, Heidelberg
 (Late) Soli P.Godrej Collection, Bombay
 Kekoo & Khorshed Gandhy collection, Bombay
 Daniela Bezzi Collection, Milan
 Tarshito Studio, Rome (14 - 8’x8’ feet Cloth Paintings)
 Marcus Leatherdale Collection, New York
 Michel Sabatier Collection, La Rochelle, France
 INTACH Collection, New Delhi
 Museum of Man Collection, Montreal
 South Delhi Polytechnic, New Delhi
 Museum Rietberg, Zurich, Switzerland
 Espace de Congrès, La Rochelle, France
 S.P.Godrej Collection, Bombay
 Diedi Von Schawen Collection, Paris
 Herve Pedriolle Collection, Paris
 British Museum, London
 SADACC Trust Collection, Norwich
 Museum of Archaeology and Anthropology, Cambridge
 National Gallery of Canada, Ottawa

References 

Artist cooperatives
Cooperatives in India
Arts organizations established in 1993
1993 establishments in Jharkhand
Indian folk art